The Wilbor House, also known as The Thompson Farm, is a historic home located at Old Chatham in Columbia County, New York.  It was built about 1790 and is a two-story, five by two bay, heavy timber frame dwelling on a raised fieldstone foundation.  It is topped by a medium pitched gable roof.  The house has a one and one half-story wing, with a single-story wing extended from it.

It was added to the National Register of Historic Places in 1997.

References

Houses on the National Register of Historic Places in New York (state)
Federal architecture in New York (state)
Houses completed in 1790
Houses in Columbia County, New York
National Register of Historic Places in Columbia County, New York